The Kucong are an ethnic group in China. They are considered one of the poorest minorities in the country. There are around 80,000 Kucong people, living primarily in the Mojiang, Xinping, and Mengla counties of China's Yunnan Province. Some live in Thailand, Myanmar, Vietnam, Laos, and the United States, where at least 600 are living as migrants.

In China

Status
The Kucong are not recognized by the Chinese government as an official minority nationality, but have been considered. The group has previously applied for a separate minority status but it was rejected in 1985. It is currently under the category of unclassified minorities in China, although they may have been officially included as part of the Lahu since 1987.

Living conditions
The people are considered as invisible people since they have little contact with other ethnic groups and they also seldom let traders see them when they sell their wares to buy some necessities. Their houses are small and narrow and a house consists of a single room without divisions and without windows. The fire is in the center, where the family members sleep with their livestock. Today, they still keep a semi-nomadic existence, living mainly from hunting and gathering; and government subsidies. Kucong children also have difficulty going to school because the medium of instruction in schools near the places they live in is Mandarin.

Wang Zhengyun
1989 Tiananmen Square protests leader Wang Zhengyun was an ethnic Kucong and at the time a student of the Central University for Nationalities. He also had the distinction of being only member of the Kucon ethnicity minority group to be studying at a university. Zhengyun was arrested in July 1989 and released two years later to return to his village in the Yunnan countryside.

In Laos
The Kucong found in Laos and are considered to be one the nation's more primitive groups. More than 3,000 Kucong inhabit at least 16 villages of northern part of the country. A subgroup of the Kucong in Laos are called Lahu Aga ('Bent Gourd Lahu') by other people because traditionally they wore a curved gourd around their necks. These are the reasons why the Kucong are often identified by some sources as part of Lahu group. There are sources, however, that cite distinctions between the two minorities. These point to key differences such as in the case of their languages. Although closely related, Kucong and Lahu are far from mutually intelligible.

References

External links
 Kucong ethnic-china.com
 Kucong millionelephants.com
 Kucong Ethnic People yunnanadventure.com

Ethnic groups in China
Ethnic groups in Laos